Resago is a cinder cone in the Linares Province of Chile.

Sources 

Cinder cones of Chile
Holocene volcanoes